Julio Correa (born July 9, 1948 in Montevideo, Uruguay) is a former Uruguayan footballer who played for clubs of Uruguay, Argentina, Chile and United States and the Uruguay national football team.

Teams
  Treinta y Tres 1970–1971
  Atlanta 1972–1974
  New York Cosmos 1975
  Central Córdoba 1975
  Huracán Buceo 1976–1978
  Cobreloa 1978–1980

External links
 Profile at Naslsoccer
 NASL stats

1948 births
Living people
Uruguayan footballers
Uruguayan expatriate footballers
Uruguay international footballers
New York Cosmos players
North American Soccer League (1968–1984) indoor players
North American Soccer League (1968–1984) players
Huracán Buceo players
Cobreloa footballers
Expatriate footballers in Chile
Expatriate footballers in Argentina
Expatriate soccer players in the United States

Association football midfielders